The Kaniet languages were two of four Western Admiralty Islands languages, a subgroup of the Admiralty Islands languages, the other two being Wuvulu-Aua and Seimat. The languages were spoken on the Kaniet Islands (Anchorite Islands) in western Manus Province of Papua New Guinea until the 1950s.

Two languages were spoken on the islands, one reported by Thilenius and one by Dempwolff.

References

Admiralty Islands languages
Languages of Manus Province
Extinct languages of Oceania
Languages extinct in the 1950s